Apply Pressure is the fifth album from R-Swift. Rhyme Council Music Group alongside Central South Records released the project on June 25, 2013.

Reception

Signaling in a four and a half star review by Jesus Freak Hideout, Kevin Hoskins responds, "The beats are hot, the rapping is tight, and the focus is Godly, making Apply Pressure a chance to be in the 'best rap album of the year' category." Mark Ryan, specifying for New Release Tuesday in a four and a half star review, recognizes, "The beats are superb, lyrical content may truly be life changing for some listeners and the heart of the artist is laid bare for all to see." Indicating in a nine out of ten review by Cross Rhythms, Steve Hayes replies, "If some albums are for the underground, 'Apply Pressure' has great commercial appeal and has the potential to reach where few Christian albums can."

Track listing

Charts

References

2013 albums
R-Swift albums